Second in Command is a 2006 American action film starring Jean-Claude Van Damme and directed by Simon Fellows. The film was released direct-to-DVD in the United States on May 2, 2006.

Plot
Commander Sam Keenan (Jean-Claude Van Damme), a decorated US Navy SEAL, is sent to the Eastern European nation of Moldavia to become the new security attaché at the US Embassy.

When he arrives, Keenan learns that Moldavia is in the middle of a civil war. At the embassy, Keenan meets with Ambassador George Norland (Colin Stinton), who designates Keenan as his "second in command" despite the traditional diplomatic hierarchy, which is contested by others afterward. Recently, the US installed a new government in Moldavia, which is led by Moldavia's newly elected president Yuri Amirev (Serban Celea). Amirev wants the nation to be run as a democratic republic, but under the command of Anton Tavarov (Velibor Topić), communist insurgents have caused a riot at the presidential palace, threatening the fragile stability of the country. The insurgents are loyal to Alexei Kirilov (Costel Lupea), the former brutal communist dictator of Moldavia.

When the palace guards start firing on the insurgents without Amirev's authorization, the insurgents storm the palace, demanding Amirev's head. Keenan volunteers to bring Amirev to the embassy. But events reach critical mass, and the insurgents open fire. Keenan barely makes it back with Amirev, but the fight isn't over yet. Fifty Americans are holed up in the embassy, and Tavarov and his massive army have arrived at the gates, with plans to crash the building and drag Amirev out by any means necessary. To add to Keenan's problems, Norland is killed by a rocket that was launched by one of Tavarov's men.

To defend the embassy, Keenan has only 15 Marines, CIA bureaucrat Frank Gaines (William Tapley), limited ammunition, and his martial arts skills to hold Tavarov's army off until American reinforcements arrive. To make matters worse, Keenan's girlfriend, reporter Michelle Whitman (Julie Cox), is one of the hostages. With Tavarov's crew getting in position for attack, a power struggle takes place between Keenan and Gaines; with help hours away, it will be up to Keenan to rescue the hostages.

When the supposedly loyal General Borgov (a personal CIA "asset" claimed by Gaines) arrives, he turns out to side with the insurgents but Keenan rescues the surviving personnel with help from arriving American military reinforcements.

Cast

 Jean-Claude Van Damme as Commander Sam Keenan
 Julie Cox as Michelle Whitman
 Alan McKenna as Captain John Baldwin
 William Tapley as Frank Gaines
 Raz Adoti as Gunnery Sergeant Earl Darnell
 Velibor Topić as Anton Tavarov
 Warren Derosa as Mike Shustec
 Ian Virgo as Corporal Will Butler
 Șerban Celea as President Yuri Amirev
 Vlad Ivanov as Regional Security Officer John Lydon
 Emanuel Pârvu as Corporal Chevantón
 Răzvan Oprea as Private First Class Devereaux
 Mihai Bisericanu as Marshall Geller
 Elizabeth Barondes as Jennifer Lennard
 Colin Stinton as Ambassador George Norland
 Dan Rădulescu as Private First Class Pazzini
 Cătălin Paraschiv as Private First Class Burke
 Eugen Cristea as General Borgov
 Costel Lupea as President Alexei Kirilov

Production
It is set and filmed in Bucharest, Romania in 50 days on June 7 and July 27, 2005.

Reception
The film opened in the 24th place with $1.04 million in the rentals chart.

David Nusair of Reel Film Reviews gave it 1.5 out of 4. He said that after Van Damme's surprisingly decent previous film Wake of Death it was hard not to be disappointed and criticized the "astonishingly inept directorial choices".

Home media
DVD was released in Region 1 in the United States on May 2, 2006. It was released in Region 2 in the United Kingdom on 15 May 2006. It was distributed by Sony Pictures Home Entertainment.

References

External links
 
 
 
 

2006 films
2006 action thriller films
2006 direct-to-video films
American action thriller films
American political thriller films
Films about the United States Marine Corps
Films about United States Navy SEALs
Films produced by Donald Kushner
Films set in Europe
Films set in a fictional country
Films shot in Bucharest
Films shot in Romania
Political action films
Sony Pictures direct-to-video films
2000s English-language films
Films directed by Simon Fellows
2000s American films